Amauta (meaning "master" or "wise one" in Quechua) was a title for teachers in the Inca empire, especially of children of the nobility.
According to Fray Martin de Murua, a missionary in Peru, education in the Inca empire was instituted in schools called Yachaywasi or "Houses of Knowledge" in Cuzco. Students were children of the Inca nobility, the future rulers. The subjects were the moral standards, religion, government tenets, statistics, math, science, "Runa-Simi" language variety of Cuzco, Khipu interpretation, art, music construction, history, agronomy, architecture, medicine, philosophy and cosmological ideas of the earth and the universe, among other subjects.

The original Yachaywasi was constructed and inaugurated by Inca Roca. More schools like this were built as the empire grew, and were the centers of teaching the primary ideologies, histories and philosophies of the empire. The amautas maintained this knowledge through an oral tradition and passed it on to future generations. 

The word is still used in modern Perú, communist José Carlos Mariategui ran a magazine named "Amauta".

See also 
 Amauta Project, sponsored by the Departamento de Ciencia y Tecnología of the OEA  (in Spanish)

 Amautas, la aventura del conocimiento

References 

   (in Spanish)
 
 Amaruk Kayshapanta. El segreto de los Amawtas. Ediciones Carena. (in Spanish)

Inca society
Peruvian culture